The La Salle Causeway is a causeway that allows Highway 2 to cross the Cataraqui River (the southern entrance of the Rideau Canal) at Kingston, Ontario. The causeway separates Kingston's inner and outer harbours. Construction of the causeway was completed on April 15, 1917.

Three bridges are incorporated into the causeway, the centre one being a Strauss trunnion bascule lift bridge, which was designed by Joseph Strauss, who designed the Golden Gate Bridge in San Francisco.

The La Salle Causeway was named after René-Robert Cavelier, Sieur de La Salle. who oversaw the construction of Fort Frontenac in 1673 at what is now the western end of the causeway.

History

The first attempt at transportation across the river was a cable-operated scow type of ferry that began operating in 1786. Two rowboats were often available for use as well.

In 1826, the Cataraqui Bridge Company was formed to build a wooden bridge "1800 feet long by 25 feet wide and built on stone piers" (549 × 7.6 m). The Cataraqui Bridge was opened in 1829. Tolls were collected from a toll booth on the west end of the bridge, and since pedestrians were charged a penny, the bridge was popularly known as the "Penny Bridge." A drawbridge allowed larger vessels to pass through but was eventually replaced by an easier-to-operate swing bridge.

In 1917, the Penny Bridge was replaced by the causeway which included three bridges: two bridges at each end of the causeway, and the centre lift bridge.  Only the original centre lift bridge remains since the steel bridges at the east and the west ends of the causeway were replaced with concrete bridges in 1962 and 1993, respectively.

See also 
 List of bascule bridges
 List of bridges in Canada

References
Notes

Bibliography

 Armstrong, Alvin. Buckskin to Broadloom - Kingston Grows Up. Kingston Whig-Standard, 1973. No ISBN.
 Mika, Nick and Helma et al. Kingston, Historic City. Belleville: Mika Publishing Co., 1987. .

Causeways in Canada
Bridges completed in 1917
Road bridges in Ontario
Transport in Kingston, Ontario
Buildings and structures in Kingston, Ontario
Former toll bridges in Canada